Derbe Respect, Alder is a collaboration album released in 2004 by Faust and Dälek.

Track listing

"Imagine What We Started" - 7:03
"Hungry for Now" - 3:03
"Remnants" - 3:59
"Dead Lies" - 8:27
"Erratic Thoughts" - 0:57
"Bullets Need Violence" - 8:13
"Collected Twighlight" - 6:22
"T-Electronique" - 6:34

References

External links
Derbe Respect, Alder. The Faust pages.

2004 albums
Dälek albums
Faust (band) albums